Yenima Arencibia Barrisontes (or Yenima Arencibia Barrizonte; born December 25, 1984, in San Luis, Pinar del Río) is a female Cuban sprint hurdler.

Career
Arencibia represented Cuba at the 2008 Summer Olympics in Beijing, where she competed for the women's 100 m hurdles, along with her teammate Anay Tejeda. She won a silver medal at the 2008 Central American and Caribbean Championships in Cali, Colombia, with her personal best time of 12.95 seconds. She is also the aunt of decathlete Yordanis García, a two-time Olympian and Pan American Games medalist.

At the 2008 Summer Olympics, Arencibia ran in the third heat against seven other athletes, including Australia's Sally Pearson, who later won a silver medal in the final. She finished the heat in sixth place by six tenths of a second (0.60) behind Pearson, outside her personal best of 13.43 seconds. Arencibia, however, failed to advance into the semi-finals, as she placed thirty-second overall, and ranked below two mandatory slots for the next round.

Personal bests
Outdoor

Indoor

All information taken from IAAF profile.

Achievements

References

External links

NBC 2008 Olympics profile
Sports reference biography

Cuban female sprinters
Cuban female hurdlers
Living people
Olympic athletes of Cuba
Athletes (track and field) at the 2008 Summer Olympics
1984 births
Central American and Caribbean Games bronze medalists for Cuba
Competitors at the 2006 Central American and Caribbean Games
Central American and Caribbean Games medalists in athletics
Competitors at the 2007 Summer Universiade
Athletes (track and field) at the 2007 Pan American Games
Athletes (track and field) at the 2011 Pan American Games
Pan American Games competitors for Cuba
People from Pinar del Río Province
21st-century Cuban women